John Culkin (born 23 August 1981) is an Irish former hurler who played for Galway Championship club Abbeyknockmoy and at inter-county level with the Galway senior hurling team. He usually lined out as a full-back or centre-back.

Career

Culkin played hurling as a schoolboy with St Flannan's College in Ennis. He was part of the Harty Cup-winning team in 2000 before later winning a Fitzgibbon Cup medal with University College Dublin. At club level, Culkin lined out with Abbeyknockmoy and was part of their intermediate team that lost the 2016 All-Ireland intermediate final to Bennettsbridge. He first appeared on the inter-county scene as captain of the Galway minor hurling team that won the 1999 All-Ireland minor final. Culkin later joined the under-21 team and spent a number of seasons with the senior team, during which time he won a National Hurling League title. He also won a Railway Cup medal with Connacht.

Career statistics

Honours

St Flannan's College
Harty Cup: 2000

University College Dublin
Fitzgibbon Cup: 2001

Abbeyknockmoy
Connacht Intermediate Club Hurling Championship: 2015
Galway Intermediate Hurling Championship: 2015

Galway
National Hurling League: 2000
All-Ireland Minor Hurling Championship: 1999

Connacht
Railway Cup: 1999

References

External link

 John Culkin player profile on the Hogan Stand website

1981 births
Living people
UCD hurlers
University of Galway hurlers
Abbeyknockmoy hurlers
Galway inter-county hurlers
Connacht inter-provincial hurlers